Ts(a)ezar (Caesar) Lvovich Kunikov (23 June 1909 – 14 February 1943) was an officer in the Soviet Naval Infantry. He served as commanding officer of a landing party that recaptured the beach-head at Malaya Zemlya during World War II.

He was mortally wounded in the battle, and was posthumously named a Hero of the Soviet Union for his heroic actions.

Kunikov was born in Rostov on Don in a Jewish family. His father was an engineer and moved to Moscow in 1925. Kunikov worked in the Soyuz factory as a machinist. In 1932, he began studies at the Bauman Moscow State Technical University, and held the position of a technical manager in a machine building factory by 1938.

At the start of the war Kunikov volunteered for the Red Army and served in the Naval infantry of the Black Sea Fleet. Kunikov fought in the battle for Novorossiysk and the defence of Malaya Zemlya. He was mortally wounded in February 1943 in Novorossiysk.

Commemoration
 Caesar Kunikov – a Russian Navy landing ship
 2280 Kunikov – an asteroid

References

 page in Russian from warheroes.ru

Heroes of the Soviet Union
Soviet Navy officers
Soviet Jews
Soviet Jews in the military
1909 births
1943 deaths
Soviet military personnel killed in World War II
People from Rostov-on-Don
Recipients of the Order of the Red Banner
Recipients of the Order of Alexander Nevsky